Filip Novák (born 26 June 1990) is a Czech professional footballer who plays as a left-back for UAE Pro League club Al Jazira and the Czech Republic national team. He holds the Fortuna Liga record for most goals scored in one season by a defender with 11 goals in the 2014–15 season.

Club career
Novák began playing football for his home team in Přerov. He moved to Zlín in 2007 and then signed for Jablonec in 2011.

Zlín
Novák played in the Czech premier league for the first time against Příbram when he was 18 years old. Then, he played only one whole match before his team was relegated to the second league in the end of the season 2008–09. It was an advantage for him because there was a less strong competition so he climbed to the top players of the team gradually.

Jablonec
In July 2011, Novák moved to Jablonec. He scored his first goal in the Fortuna Liga against Dukla Prague on 1 October 2012. On 17 May 2013, Novák won the Czech Cup with Jablonec, after playing he whole final match and scoring in the penalty shootout. He won the Czech Supercup against the league champion, FC Viktoria Plzeň with Jablonec on 12 July 2013. By winning the Czech Cup in the previous season, Jablonec qualified for the UEFA Europa League where they eliminated Strømsgodset IF in the Third Qualifying Round before being eliminated by Real Betis in the Play-off Round.

Al Jazira
On 30 September 2022, Novák moved to Al Jazira.

International career

Youth
Novák was a part of the Czech Republic national under-21 football team which was playing in the European Under-21 Championship qualification in 2013. He scored his first under-21 goal against Wales. They ran up from the group 3 as the winner but unfortunately were beaten by Russia in play-off round to the final tournament.

Senior
Novák's debut for the Czech Republic national team was on 31 March 2015 in a friendly match against Slovakia; he played the last 10 minutes of the game.

Career statistics

Club

International goals
Scores and results list Czech Republic's goal tally first, score column indicates score after each Novák goal.

Honours
Jablonec
Czech Cup: 2012–13
Czech Supercup: 2013

Trabzonspor
Turkish Cup: 2019–20

References

External links
 
 
 

Living people
1990 births
Sportspeople from Přerov
Czech footballers
Association football defenders
Czech Republic youth international footballers
Czech Republic under-21 international footballers
Czech Republic international footballers
Czech First League players
Czech National Football League players
FC Fastav Zlín players
FK Jablonec players
FC Midtjylland players
Trabzonspor footballers
Fenerbahçe S.K. footballers
Danish Superliga players
Süper Lig players
Czech expatriate footballers
Expatriate men's footballers in Denmark
Expatriate footballers in Turkey
Czech expatriate sportspeople in Denmark
Czech expatriate sportspeople in Turkey
Al Jazira Club players
Czech expatriate sportspeople in the United Arab Emirates
Expatriate footballers in the United Arab Emirates